Bosque Formosa Esporte Clube, commonly known as Formosa, is a Brazilian football club based in Formosa, Goiás state. Despite the fact that the club is from Goiás, the club competes in the Campeonato Brasiliense due to its proximity to Brasília city. The club was formerly known as Bosque Esporte Clube and Formosa Esporte Clube.

History
The club was founded on September 21, 1978, as Bosque Esporte Clube, being renamed to Bosque Formosa Esporte Clube in the 2000s, and to Formosa Esporte Clube in 2008. They won the Campeonato Brasiliense Second Level in 1999. The club eventually adopted again the name Bosque Formosa Esporte Clube. They finished as runners-up in the Campeonato Brasiliense Second Level in 2010, thus gaining promotion to the 2011 Campeonato Brasiliense.

Rivaries
The club's main historic rival is Goiás Esporte Clube due to the fact that both clubs are based in Goiás and are neighboring teams.

Achievements

 Campeonato Brasiliense Second Level:
 Winners (1): 1999

Stadium
Bosque Formosa Esporte Clube play their home games at Estádio Diogo Francisco Gomes, nicknamed Diogão. The stadium has a maximum capacity of 8,000 people.

References

Association football clubs established in 1978
Football clubs in Goiás
1978 establishments in Brazil